Sexenio is the Spanish term for a period of six years. It may also refer to:
 Sexenio (Mexico), the six-year term limit on the Mexican presidency and state governments
 Sexenio (Bolivia) (1946–1952), the six-year period in the history of Bolivia that preceded the 1952 Revolution
 Sexenio Democrático (Spain) (1868–1874), the period from the overthrow of Queen Isabella II to the Bourbon Restoration in Spain

See also
 , a festival held in Morella, Castellón, Spain